The rock beauty (Holacanthus tricolor), also known as corn sugar, coshubba, rock beasty, catalineta, and yellow nanny, is a species of marine ray-finned fish, a marine angelfish belonging to the family Pomacanthidae. It is found in the western Atlantic Ocean.

Description
The rock beauty has an deep oval and strongly compressed body, with a short snout, ending in a small mouth equipped with bristle-like teeth. There is a large spine in the angle of the preopercle which has a serrated vertical edge. The bone lying between the preopercle and gill cover has 1-4 large spines. The juveniles are yellowish on their body and fins, with a blue margined black spot on the upper posterior part of the body. As they mature into adults the spot grows, eventually covering most of the body and the lower part of the dorsal fin and the upper part of then anal fin. The head and anterior quarter of the body are yellow, as are the pectoral, pelvic and caudal fins. The mouth is purple. the front edge of the anal fin and margin of operculum are orange. In the eye there is vivid blue on the upper and lower portions of the iris. In the dorsal fin there are 14 spines and 17-19 soft rays while the anal fin contains 3 spines and 18-20 soft rays.

Distribution
The rock beauty is found in the Western Atlantic Ocean where it ranges from 
Bermuda  and the waters off Georgia and Florida in southwards through the Caribbean Sea and along the coasts of South America as far as Rio de Janeiro. It is uncommon and localised in the Gulf of Mexico where it only occurs at the Flower Gardens Banks off Texas and off Veracruz and on the Campeche Bank in Mexico.

Habitat and biology
They occur around jetties, rocky reefs and coral reefs, while the juveniles are often seen in areas of fire coral. They feed largely on sponges but will also eat corals, zoantharians, bryozoans, gorgonians, tunicates and algae.

The adults are normally encountered as pairs and appear to form long term monogamous pairs. These pairs frequently consist of a larger individual and a smaller one, possibly indicating sexual dimorphism, although there is no sexual dichromatism. During mating the pair ascends in the water column, with their abdomens close together while they release eggs and milt into the water. A female can lay between 25,000 and 75,000 eggs in an evening, and up to 10 million in a season. The transparent eggs are pelagic and float in the water, hatching after 15–20 hours. The initial larvae have a large yolk sac and lack functional eyes, gut or fins. After 48 hours the yolk is absorbed and the larvae have more of a resemblance to normal fish. These larvae feed on plankton in the water. They grow rapidly, and after around 3–4 weeks from hatching they settle on the substrate. They are highly territorial but, unlike some related species, they do not act as cleaner fish. Their diet is thought to be plankton, benthic invertebrates and the mucus secreted by other fish.

Systematics
The rock beauty was first formally described in 1795 as Chaetodon tricolor by the German physician and naturalist Marcus Elieser Bloch (1723–1799) with the type locality given as Brazil. When Bernard Germain de Lacépède created the genus Holocanthus he used Chaetodon tricolor as the type species. The species is placed by some authorities in the monotypic subgenus Holacanthus, all the others being in the subgenus Angelichthys. The specific name of this species, tricolor, refers to the three colour pattern of some adults which have a yellow front and black rear to the body with ref fin margins.

Utilisation
The rock beauty is one of the more popular Caribbean marine angelfish in the aquarium trade. It has become available as a captive bred specimens in the 2020s.

References

External links

 

rock beauty
Fish of the Western Atlantic
rock beauty
Articles containing video clips
Taxa named by Marcus Elieser Bloch